The 1st Annual Tranny Awards were a pornographic awards event recognizing the best in transgender pornography form the previous year from November 1, 2007 to 31 October 2008. Nominations were announced online on December 16, 2008 on Grooby.com. The winners were announced online on January 9, 2009. The winners were decided by a panel of industry judges. It was the first installment of the Tranny Awards which are now known as the Transgender Erotica Awards.

This was the first awards dedicated to recognising achievements in transgender pornography. Steven Grooby the founder of the awards stated that he wanted to address the lack of representation of transgender performers in awards.

Winners and nominees

The nominees for the 1st Tranny Awards were announced on December 16, 2008, online on the Grooby.com website. The winners were announced during the awards ceremony on January 9, 2009.

Awards

Winners are listed first, highlighted in boldface.

References 

Transgender Erotica Awards
Pornographic film awards
21st-century awards
American pornographic film awards
Annual events in the United States
Awards established in 2008
Adult industry awards